Pseudozarba is a genus of moths in the subfamily Eustrotiinae of the family Noctuidae. The genus was described by Warren in 1913.

Species
Pseudozarba abbreviata Rothschild, 1921 Niger
Pseudozarba aethiops (Distant, 1898) Arabia, Sudan, Ethiopia, Kenya, Tanzania, Malawi, Botswana, Zambia, Zimbabwe, South Africa, Angola, Zaire, Gambia, Niger, Nigeria, Madagascar, Seychelles
Pseudozarba bella Rothschild, 1921 Niger
Pseudozarba bipartita (Herrich-Schäffer, [1850]) northern Africa, southern Europe, Sicily, Iran, Israel
Pseudozarba carnibasalis (Hampson, 1918) Ghana, Ethiopia, Kenya, Uganda, Malawi, Tanzania
Pseudozarba cupreofascia (Le Cerf, 1922) Burkina Faso, Yemen, Ethiopia, Kenya, Tanzania
Pseudozarba excavata (Walker, 1865) southern India
Pseudozarba expatriata (Hampson, 1914) Cape Verde, Senegal, Burkina Faso, northern Nigeria, Gambia
Pseudozarba featheri Hacker, 2016 Kenya
Pseudozarba fornax Hacker, 2016 Yemen, Oman
Pseudozarba hemiplaca (Meyrick, 1902)
Pseudozarba kaduna Hacker, 2016 Burkina Faso, northern Nigeria
Pseudozarba leucopera (Hampson, 1910)
Pseudozarba marmoreata Hacker, 2016 northern Nigeria
Pseudozarba mesozona (Hampson, 1896) Arabia, Egypt, Djibouti, Eritrea, Sokotra
Pseudozarba mianoides (Hampson, 1893) Sri Lanka
Pseudozarba morosa Wiltshire, 1970 Burkina Faso, Nigeria, Gambia, Sudan
Pseudozarba nilotica Hacker, 2016 Ethiopia
Pseudozarba ochromaura Hacker, 2016 Namibia, South Africa, Ethiopia
Pseudozarba opella (Swinhoe, 1885) Cape Verde, Ghana, Nigeria, Niger, Sudan, Eritrea, Somalia, Kenya, Zimbabwe, South Africa, India, Australia
Pseudozarba orthopetes Meyrick, 1897
Pseudozarba ozarbica (Hampson, 1910)
Pseudozarba plumbicilia (Draudt, 1950) Sichuan
Pseudozarba poliochlora Hacker, 2016 Tanzania
Pseudozarba reducta Warren, 1913 Mumbai
Pseudozarba regula (Gaede, 1916) Togo, Ghana, Kenya, Burundi, Zaire, South Africa
Pseudozarba rufigrisea Warren, 1913 Sumba
Pseudozarba schencki (Strand, 1912) Angola, Namibia, South Africa, Arabia

References

Acontiinae